James Culbertson Reynolds House is a historic home located at Monticello, White County, Indiana. It was built in 1873, and is a large two-story, Italianate style brick dwelling.  It features an intricately designed front porch and decorative cornice with large brackets.  Also on the property are the contributing coal shed (now a garage) and smokehouse.

It was listed on the National Register of Historic Places in 1982.

References

Houses on the National Register of Historic Places in Indiana
Italianate architecture in Indiana
Houses completed in 1873
Buildings and structures in White County, Indiana
National Register of Historic Places in White County, Indiana